Greater Asunción, is the metropolitan area of the capital city of Paraguay, Asunción.

It consists of twenty cities: Asunción itself, the capital, and the surrounding cities in Central Department. One in three Paraguayans live in this metropolitan area, which has more than 2.7 million inhabitants.

List of cities in Great Asunción

Transportation
The Silvio Pettirossi International Airport in Luque connects this metropolitan area with other American and European destinations.

References

Geography of Asunción
Asunción